Roller sports at the 2010 Asian Games were held in Guangzhou Velodrome, Guangzhou, China from 23 to 26 November 2010. Track roller speed skating was held from 23 to 24 November while Artistic roller skating was held from 25 to 26 November.

Schedule

Medalists

Artistic skating

Men's speed skating

Women's speed skating

Medal table

Participating nations
A total of 62 athletes from 7 nations competed in roller sports at the 2010 Asian Games:

References

External links
 
 2010 Asian Games - Roller Sports - Competition Schedule by Event

 
2010 Asian Games events
2010